This is a round-up of the 1980 Sligo Intermediate Football Championship. Curry had been relegated from Senior level the previous year, but their absence would be brief as they claimed the Championship, with Owenmore Gaels again the beaten finalists.

Quarter finals

Semi-finals

Sligo Intermediate Football Championship Final

Sligo Intermediate Football Championship
Sligo Intermediate Football Championship